The 5th Element is the second studio album by American pop/R&B singer-songwriter Tynisha Keli, which was released Internationally on August 25, 2010, in Japan, the United States, and Europe by Eight72 Entertainment/Warner Japan. The album's production was a collaborative effort between Tynisha Keli and Tha Cornaboyz.

Background
In early 2010, Tynisha Keli announced that she would be departing from her longtime record label Warner Brother Records after she asked to be released, but would be recording a sophomore project. Tynisha signed with Eight72 Entertainment, an Atlanta-based independent label run by her longtime managers Tyrrell Bing and Lamar Chase.

After much success in Japan with her previous album, The Chronicles of Tk, where she sold over 600,000 copies, Tynisha set out to record a new album to be released in the US, Japan and Europe.

On Tynisha's first album she worked with many big name songwriters, and producers but for her second album wanted to stick to the talented people inside Tha Cornaboyz camp. She selected Pierre Medor to vocal arrange the entire project. She also enlisted the help of songwriter Atozzio Townes, who has written for artists like Chris Brown, Keke Palmer and Ray J. She also worked with the new up-and-coming songwriting/music production team called Write Time Music Group based in  Atlanta; they were responsible for writing 4 songs on the album, two out of the four songs written by WTMG were also produced by Dominic Gordon, which is a music producer in the group (Next Time, Half a Man, Heart Break and Calling my Name).

Release and promotion
The album was completed in March 2010, and on March 16, 2010, Tynisha hosted an album-listening party at Atlanta's BMI offices.

The first single for the album, "Next Time", produced by Reefa, DR and 12Keyz (C2) and written by Write Time Music Group dropped on June 23, 2010.

On June 16, 2010. during a live interview with Large FM, Tynisha herself, along with her manager Tyrrell Bing of Tha CornaBoyz, premiered her new single, Tha CornaBoyz-penned and -produced ballad "The Right Way", although the single was not available for purchase until July.

Tynisha's second Japanese single, "Love Hurts", became an instant hit when it debuted at number one on the International Master Ringtone Download Chart and Mobile Single Download Chart. A video for the single was shot in Yokohama, Japan by director Masaki Ohkita,

"The 5th Element" was released to iTunes Japan on August 17, 2010. The hard copy version of the album hit Japanese Stores distributed by Warner Japan on August 25. The album also hit iTunes in the United States, and Europe on August 25, 2010. The Japanese edition of the album features collaborations by Japanese artist Coma Chi "Love Hurts", and Jay'ed "The Right Way". The US edition does not include these versions of those songs. Also on the US edition "Love Hurts" is listed with its original title "Worst Enemy".

On August 25, 2010, Tynisha Keli along with rapper Jay Beretta, and her manager, Tyrrell Bing, appeared on LargeFM's online radio show to launch the album. During the show she conducted an in studio interview that was broadcast via webcam on the net. They also played four tracks from the album, which included "Heart Break", "How To Love", "Right Here Waiting", and "Live Without You".

On September 20, 2010, Tynisha performed at the Shibuya Woman Festival in Japan in support of The 5th Element. The set included "Love Hurts", "The Right Way", and "I Wish You Loved Me". On September 21, 2010 Tynisha made her very first television appearance in Japan with a performance of "Love Hurts" on the T.V show Waratte Iitomo "It's Okay To Laugh".

Singles
 The first single from the album is titled "Next Time". It was released to US on June 23, 2010. It was also released as the first single in Japan as well.
 "The Right Way" is the second single it was released on July 27, 2010. The song is the second single to be released in the US, and it will serve as a US only single.
 "Love Hurts" is the second single released to Japan. It features Japanese rapper Coma Chi. On July 28, 2010 it debuted at #1 on the Japanese single charts becoming Tynisha's first #1 hit. A video for the single was shot in Yokohama, Japan by director Masaki Ohkita.

Track listing
Standard Edition

iTunes bonus tracks
 "Next Time" (Remix)
iTunes Japan bonus tracks
 "Love Hurts" (Original Version)

Chart performance

Release history

References

External links
 Official Website

2010 albums
Tynisha Keli albums